Daniel Jesús "Dani" Martín Gil (born 31 May 1997), sometimes known as Dani Flaco, is a Spanish footballer who plays for Calvo Sotelo Puertollano CF as a left back.

Club career
Born in Las Palmas, Canary Islands, Martín joined UD Las Palmas' youth setup in 2005, aged eight. He made his senior debut with the C-team during the 2015–16 season, in the regional leagues.

Martín was definitely promoted to the reserves in Segunda División B ahead of the 2018–19 campaign, but was only sparingly used. On 20 July 2019, he signed a new one-year deal with the club, and became a regular starter for the B's afterwards.

Martín made his first team debut on 17 November 2019, starting in a 1–2 away loss against CD Mirandés in the Segunda División championship. On 31 August 2021, he moved to Segunda División RFEF side Calvo Sotelo Puertollano CF.

References

External links
 
 
 

1997 births
Living people
Footballers from Las Palmas
Spanish footballers
Association football defenders
Segunda División players
Segunda División B players
Tercera División players
Divisiones Regionales de Fútbol players
UD Las Palmas C players
UD Las Palmas Atlético players
UD Las Palmas players